"Video Nasty" is the fifth episode of series 5 of the BBC sitcom, Only Fools and Horses, first broadcast on 28 September 1986. In the episode, Rodney receives a grant to make a local film, but Del sees it as an opportunity to make money.

Synopsis
At The Nag's Head, as Trigger and Boycie talk about Marlene's inability to have children, Rodney enters to tell everyone that he and Mickey Pearce have been given £10,000 by their evening art class teacher to make a local community film. Del Boy and Albert also enter and tell everyone that they have been borrowing hay bales from a private zoo run by Abdul's cousin's girlfriend's brother's friend, as well as having been to see Monkey Harris' sister's husband's first wife's stepfather, who works for an animal food company. Rodney tells everyone that he is writing the story of the film, and Mickey is directing.

The next day at the flat, Rodney suffers from writer's block when trying to come up with a plot, until Del returns from the market with a broken, derelict typewriter. After showing him how hard he has to hit the keys, Del tells Rodney to begin typing. But Rodney says that he cannot think of an idea for a story. Del mentions that he has an idea for a story called "There's a Rhino Loose in the City", which is about a rhinoceros who escapes from a zoo and comes out at night to kill people in London, while hiding in the day, and a private detective is called in to try to solve the crime, while trying to seduce a female zookeeper. Rodney refuses to use Del's tacky story in his film.

At a Chinese takeaway, Del tells Rodney that Mickey Pearce is practicing using the camera by videoing weddings for hire. Boycie and Marlene enter, and Marlene tells the Trotters that they are holding a party at the Nag's Head the following Friday to celebrate the 20th anniversary of her and Boycie's marriage, and the Trotters promise to be there. This inspires Rodney to write that in his film.

A few days later, back at the flat, Del shows Rodney a list of extras (who have to pay Del £10 to take part) to use in his film, as well as a list of businesses to advertise. Just then, Mickey Pearce enters with the video equipment and his girlfriend Amanda, as Del and Albert exit. Rodney is disgusted to see that Mickey is filming a porn movie involving Amanda wearing a nurse's uniform and stripping for Boycie, and Rodney accidentally gets caught on tape.

On Friday, at the Nag's Head, after Mickey finishes filming Boycie and Marlene's anniversary, all the gang head into the back room to watch the British premiere of "Night Nurse" "based on the novel by Enid Blyton". Rodney quickly realises that is what Mickey and his girlfriend have been filming in the flat, and quietly escapes once the video starts. Del angrily screams out Rodney's name the moment he sees him in the film.

Back at Nelson Mandela House, Rodney tells Del that he did not know what Mickey was going to do. Del mentions that the people backing up Boycie in his dirty movies are the Driscoll Brothers. As Del heads to the bathroom to flush the Night Nurse videotape down the toilet, Mickey Pearce and his friends show up to party, and Rodney lets them in, just for Del to chase them out. Rodney then gets a telephone call from his art teacher, who is not overly impressed with Rodney's idea, but is willing to try to film it anyway. Rodney then says Del knows where there is a rhino going cheap, revealing that Rodney's idea is There's a Rhino Loose in the City after all.

Episode cast

Episode concept
The idea for the script was based on a true story about a youth club that was given a grant from the local council to do filming, but all the equipment and money disappeared shortly afterwards.

Music
 Pet Shop Boys: "West End Girls"
 Status Quo: "Red Sky"
 Roxy Music: "Avalon"

References

External links

1986 British television episodes
Adult video in fiction
Only Fools and Horses (series 5) episodes